The Texas General Land Office (GLO) is a state agency of the U.S. state of Texas, responsible for managing lands and mineral rights properties that are owned by the state. The GLO also manages and contributes to the state's Permanent School Fund. The agency is headquartered in the Stephen F. Austin State Office Building in Downtown Austin.

Role and remit
The General Land Office's main role is to manage Texas's publicly owned lands, by negotiating and enforcing leases for the use of the land, and sometimes by making sales of public lands. Royalties and proceeds from land sales are added to the state's Permanent School Fund, which helps to fund public education within the state. The agency is also responsible for keeping records of land grants and titles and for issuing maps and surveys of public lands. The agency also manages federal disaster recovery grant funding.

Since 2011 the GLO has managed The Alamo in San Antonio. The management of the Alamo was transferred to the General Land Office after allegations of mismanagement were directed at the prior manager, the Daughters of the Republic of Texas.

History
The Congress of the Republic of Texas established the General Land Office on 22 December 1836 (making the GLO the oldest existing Texas public agency). The agency's constitutional purpose was to "superintend, execute, and perform all acts touching or respecting the public lands of Texas." Since its establishment the agency has been located in Austin, although a relocation to Houston was briefly attempted during the Texas Archive War. One former home of the GLO, the Old Land Office Building, is a registered historic place and now serves as the Texas State Capitol Visitor's Center.

When Texas was annexed into the United States in 1845, it kept control of all of its public lands from its time as a sovereign state. As a result, Texas is the only US state to control all of its own public lands; all federal lands in Texas were acquired by purchase (e.g. military bases) or donation (e.g. national parks).

Texas's public lands were significantly enlarged by the US Submerged Lands Act of 1953 and the resolution of the ensuing Tidelands Controversy. Because Texas's historical territorial waters originated with the Republic, the US Supreme Court ruled in 1960 that Texas was in the unique position of owning territory out to three leagues (10.35 miles) from its coastline (significantly more than the three miles controlled by other coastal states). All of these lands (and the oil and gas deposits beneath them) are managed by the General Land Office.

Texas Land Commissioner 

The head of the General Land Office is the Texas Land Commissioner, a statewide public official elected every four years. The current land commissioner is Dawn Buckingham, who was elected on 8 November 2022. She announced that she would seek her party's nomination to replace Bush as Land Commissioner.

See also

 Permanent School Fund

References

External links
 
 

State agencies of Texas
Government agencies established in 1836
Land management in the United States
1836 establishments in the Republic of Texas